The Cal State San Marcos Cougars are the athletic teams that represent California State University, San Marcos, located in San Marcos, California, in intercollegiate sports as a member of the Division II level of the National Collegiate Athletic Association (NCAA), primarily competing in the California Collegiate Athletic Association (CCAA) since the 2015–16 academic year. The Cougars previously competed as an NAIA Independent within the Association of Independent Institutions (AII) of the National Association of Intercollegiate Athletics (NAIA) from 1998–99 (when the school began its athletics program and joined the NAIA) to 2014–15.

History
In baseball, the school has Dennis Pugh, who coached at a local high school for decades, and for soccer coach Ron Pulvers.  In 2007, the school hired former UCLA All-American Kelly Warren who was previously the Associate Head Coach at fellow San Diego County CSU, San Diego State University.

The university's surf team competes in the National Scholastic Surfing Association (NSSA). The team won the NSSA collegiate national championship in 2009. The school also has women's volleyball, and men's and women's basketball.

As of 2012, the Athletic Program has so far dominated the A.I.I. conference by having 6 teams emerge as conference champions.

Mascot
The original mascot of the campus was Tukwut, the name for the California mountain lion in the Luiseño language of the local Native American Luiseño people. However, the mascot was "dropped for something with more ring," and in a referendum students selected "cougar" over "mountain lion." The dropping of the indigenous word was criticized by a faculty member at CSU San Marcos.

National championships

Team

Accomplishments
CSU San Marcos leads as of 2020 in the Women's Golf CCAA Championships and was the runner-up in the 2019 NCAA Division II Women's Golf Championships.

Varsity teams
CSUSM competes in 15 intercollegiate varsity sports: Men's sports include baseball, basketball, cross country, golf, soccer and track & field (indoor and outdoor); while women's sports include basketball, cross country, golf, soccer, softball, track & field (indoor and outdoor) and volleyball. Former sports included cheerleading and dance.

Men's basketball
Jim Saiawas the men's basketball head coach, who led the team to the NAIA Division I National Championship Tournament in 2012–2013.

Women's basketball
In 2010, Cal State San Marcos hired former Palomar College head coach, Sheri Jennum, as their women's basketball head coach.

Cross country
Track legend Steve Scott was the Cougars' cross country and track & field coach for 20 years. They train and/or compete on the Mangrum Track and Field when outdoors. In fall 2009, the women's cross country team won their first NAIA National Championship. They went on to defend their title the next year in fall 2010.

Graduation information
Every year, the NCAA releases the Academic Success Rate (ASR) of all Division II institutions publicly. The graduation-rate statistics are founded on a six-year cohort model implemented by the U.S. Department of Education.

Championships

Appearances 
The Cal State San Marcos Cougars competed in the NCAA Tournament across 2 active sports (2 women's) 2 times at the Division II level.

 Women's cross country (1): 2017 (Team)
 Women's outdoor track and field (2): 2018 (Individual), 2019 (Individual)
 Women's golf (1): 2019 (Team)

Team 

Below is one national club team championship:

 Co-ed surfing (1): 2009 (NSSA)

References

External links
 

California Collegiate Athletic Association teams
NCAA Division II teams
Sports teams in San Diego